Elliott Corner is an unincorporated community in Mariposa County, California.

References

Unincorporated communities in California
Unincorporated communities in Mariposa County, California